Robin Mulhauser (born 7 November 1991) is a Swiss motorcycle racer. He has competed in the Supersport World Championship and the Moto2 World Championship.

Career statistics

Supersport World Championship

Races by year

Grand Prix motorcycle racing

By season

Races by year

External links

1991 births
Living people
Swiss motorcycle racers
Moto2 World Championship riders
Supersport World Championship riders
People from Fribourg
Sportspeople from the canton of Fribourg